is a Japanese manga series by Koi Ikeno. It was serialized in Shueisha's manga magazine Ribon from July 1982 to October 1994 and became a huge commercial success. The manga series had a circulation of 30 million copies in total, making it one of the best-selling manga series. An anime television series directed by Hiroshi Sasagawa was adapted from the manga and was broadcast on Nippon TV from October 7, 1982 to September 22, 1983.

Plot
15-year-old Ranze Eto lives in an isolated castle in Japan with her werewolf mother, vampire father, and younger brother, Rinze.  Despite her lineage, she has yet to demonstrate any special powers of her own, and her parents are worried she might be a normal girl.  One day, Ranze's innate power finally manifests itself when she, quite by accident, discovers that she can change herself into a carbon copy of any object she bites, whether it be a person or an inanimate object like a piece of bread, and can return to her normal self only by sneezing.  Her parents are overjoyed, but Ranze's new powers make it difficult to continue living life as a normal teenage girl.

On Ranze's first day at her new school in junior high, she meets and falls in love with the brash yet handsome young athlete, Shun Makabe. The chief problem with this is that Ranze's parents will not allow her to date a human - although there may be much more to Shun than meets the eye. On top of this, she also has a bitter rival in the pretty but spiteful Yoko Kamiya (the daughter of a yakuza boss) who also likes Shun and doesn't take kindly to Ranze's intruding on her turf.

Final anime episode
Since the anime series ended years before the manga, the writers had to create an original ending. This leaves the story open-ended. In the last episode, it had Shun being discovered of a star birthmark, proving that he is actually the long lost prince of the Demon World. Ranze is thrilled by the news, meaning she'll be able to marry him. However, when confronted by the King, Shun denies being the long-lost-prince and claiming the star as a bruise. The King bans the Eto Family from the Demon World, until they can bring back his long-lost-son. When Shun returns home, his mother reveals that the star is actually a birthmark and he realizes that he's the true long lost prince of the Demon World, and the Eto family were right about it all along. The following morning, Shun tries to talk to Ranze about that star on the way to school, but Yoko ends up interrupting the conversation. The series closed with a special ending, with not only Ranze but the main cast dancing (in cloaks) to the ending, "Super Love Lotion".

Characters

Eto Family

The lead character, a 15-year-old girl, Ranze originally manifests no supernatural powers until she bites Yoko Kamiya and discovers she has vampiric powers that let her "metamorph" into whatever she bites a certain way.
 
Ranze's 5-year-old younger brother, he appears to not have any supernatural powers, but seems to be the only one that can tell who Ranze really is when she is transformed.
 
Ranze's father, a vampire
 
Ranze's mother, a werewolf
 
A parrot born in the Spirit World.

Makabe Family

The boy Ranze loves whom she also sits next to in class.
 
Shun's mother

Kamiya Family

Ranze's romantic rival, the spoiled daughter of a yakuza lord who also fancies Shun.
 
Yoko's father. An enormous, bulky man who develops a crush on Hanae Makabe.

Others
 
Ranze's classmate who has a crush on her

A demon who is the Prince of Spirit Kingdom. He has the ability to duplicate anything he touches. He is in love with Ranze.

A 158-year-old demon

Ranze's middle school teacher.

Media

Manga
There are 30 volumes in the original release of the manga series in Japan. In 2006, they sold 26 million copies, making Tokimeki Tonight the sixth best-selling shōjo manga.
Volume 1, 
Volume 2, 
Volume 3, 
Volume 4, 
Volume 5, 
Volume 6, 
Volume 7, 
Volume 8, 
Volume 9, 
Volume 10, 
Volume 11, 
Volume 12, 
Volume 13, 
Volume 14, 
Volume 15, 
Volume 16, 
Volume 17, 
Volume 18, 
Volume 19, 
Volume 20, 
Volume 21, 
Volume 22, 
Volume 23, 
Volume 24, 
Volume 25, 
Volume 26, 
Volume 27, 
Volume 28, 
Volume 29, 
Volume 30,

Tokimeki Midnight
In 2002, a second manga series called Tokimeki Midnight (ときめきミッドナイト, "Exciting Midnight"), also by Koi Ikeno, began serialization in Shueisha's magazine Cookie. The manga is an alternate retelling where the roles are reverse. The series completed in 2009 at nine volumes.

Tokimeki Tonight Sorekara
On May 26, 2021, a sequel, Tokimeki Tonight Sorekara (ときめきトゥナイト それから, "Exciting Tonight and Then"), which takes place after the third arc where Ranze and Makabe's daughter Aira saves the world from crisis and centers on the lead protagonist Ranze as her 40s, began serialization in Cookie magazine starting from July 2021 issue.

Anime
A 34-episode anime television series adaptation, directed by Hiroshi Sasagawa and produced by Group TAC and Toho, aired in Japan between October 7, 1982 and September 22, 1983 on Nippon TV. Its opening theme is "Tokimeki Tonight" and its ending theme is "Super Love Lotion". Since Group TAC closed its doors as a studio, Toho has been the sole rights-holder of the series.

Episode list
 Ranze Eto's Secret (October 7, 1982)
 Door to The Demon World (October 14, 1982)
 Bathroom Crisis (October 21, 1982)
 A Small Friendship (October 28, 1982)
 Ranze goes to the Demon World (November 4, 1982)
 Foggy Night Romance (November 11, 1982)
 Beware the Cultural Festival (November 18, 1982)
 Love, Camera, Action (November 25, 1982)
 Tamasaburo's Love (December 2, 1982)
 The Invisible Girl, Miel (December 9, 1982)
 Birthday of the Full Moon (December 16, 1982)
 Eh?? Ranze's Wish (December 23, 1982)
 White Sweethearts (January 6, 1983)
 I saw it!! Ranze is a Tanuki! (January 13, 1983)
 Sorry for the Nudity (January 20, 1983)
 Love of The Young Runner (January 27, 1983)
 Fickle Magic Teacher (February 3, 1983)
 Title Match of Love (February 10, 1983)
 The Sentimental Giant (February 17, 1983)
 Chaos! Too many Ranzes! (February 24, 1983)
 Love Letter from E.T. (March 3, 1983)
 Panic! Pajama Game (March 10, 1983)
 Sand's Love Story (March 17, 1983)
 Ardent Love! Great War in the Demon World (March 24, 1983)
 The Transformation is seen! Shun must die (March 31, 1983)
 Execution Battleship! Space Wars (April 28, 1983)
 Clash! Rocky VS Shun (May 5, 1983)
 Stretching Angel, Hunter of Love (May 19, 1983)
 Shock! Future Encounter (June 9, 1983)
 The Prince's Order of Assassination  (June 16, 1983)
 The Migratory Bird Returns (June 23, 1983)
 Venture! Island of Sweethearts (July 7, 1983)
 Tokimeki Folklore Comic (July 28, 1983)
 I Love you! I Love you! Love Triangle! (September 22, 1983)

Reception
The manga had a circulation of 30 million copies in 2021.

On Anime News Network, Justin Sevakis said the anime was "a thirty year-old comedy that's still funny, with a setup that's still plausible and interesting, and animation that's still serviceable".

References

External links
 

1982 anime television series debuts
1982 manga
1983 Japanese television series endings
2002 manga
Group TAC
Anime series based on manga
Nippon TV original programming
Romantic comedy anime and manga
Fiction about shapeshifting
Shōjo manga
Shueisha franchises
Shueisha manga
Supernatural anime and manga
Vampires in animated television
Vampires in anime and manga
Television series about werewolves
Anime and manga about werewolves